The Molalla Buckeroo Rodeo is an annual rodeo in Molalla, Oregon, United States. It is held on Independence Day, July 4.

History
The Molalla Buckeroo has been held annually since September 1913, when the railroad came to town. During the early years, the local firemen sponsored the rodeo as an equipment fundraiser. In 1923, the Molalla Buckeroo Association was formed and took over the operation of the Rodeo.

No Buckeroo was held in 1917–18, 1942–45 nor 2020.

Mission
Support community charitable programs, organizations, and causes
Support and promote a family oriented community event
Preserve the oldest form of American Heritage, the rodeo
Promote tourism and development in Clackamas County

Logo 
The Molalla Buckeroo began work to re-design their logo in early 2006.

Organization 
Currently the Molalla Buckeroo Rodeo Association, a nonprofit corporation, has over 60 active members who are all volunteers. These volunteers provide the management, production, and labor to ensure the continued success of the annual Buckeroo event, as well as helping with other events throughout the year. The Molalla Buckeroo Association is a major part of the Molalla community.

The main structure of the Molalla Buckeroo Association is made up of a Board of Directors.  The Board of Directors, under the association's bylaws allow up to 50 directors.  There is also Honorary members, who have been elected to Honorary status by the Board of Directors. Honorary members are previous regular directors that can still be active or inactive in the Association.  Like Directors, Honorary Directors can vote on decisions made by the Board of Directors.  Associate Members are members
who have been accepted into the association by the Executive Committee.  after at least 1 year, an associate member can be voted into the Association as a Director by the Board of Directors when positions open up.

The Buckeroo has a seven-member executive committee that is responsible for managing the extensive and varied committee structure of this organization. The Executive committee members are elected to the committee by the Board of Directors.

As a member of the Professional Rodeo Cowboys Association (PRCA), the Molalla Buckeroo Association puts on one of the largest rodeos in the Pacific Northwest and of the Columbia River Circuit of the PRCA. The Molalla Buckeroo was named Columbia River Circuit Rodeo of the Year in 2005.

In addition to the annual PRCA rodeo, the Molalla Buckeroo Association also hosts several Willamette Valley Junior Rodeo Association events, BRN 4D Barrel racing, and the annual Professional Bull Riders (PBR) Ross Coleman Invitational/Make-a-Wish Foundation event.

Events 
There are seven events that are held at the Molalla Buckeroo Rodeo:
Bareback riding
Calf roping
Steer wrestling
Saddle bronc riding
Team roping
Barrel racing
Bull riding

References

External links 
 Molalla Buckeroo (official website)

Tourist attractions in Clackamas County, Oregon
Festivals in Oregon
Rodeos
Recurring events established in 1913
Molalla, Oregon
1913 establishments in Oregon
Annual events in Oregon
Festivals established in 1913